The  were a class of eight fast torpedo boats of the Imperial Japanese Navy built before and operated during World War II.

Development
To circumvent the terms of the 1930 London Naval Treaty, which limited its total destroyer tonnage the Imperial Japanese Navy designed the  torpedo boat, but planned to arm it with half the armament of a  destroyer. The resultant design was top-heavy and unstable, resulting in the 1934 Tomozuru Incident, in which one of the Chidori-class vessels capsized. The subsequent investigation revealed the fundamental design flaw, and the four vessels in the class which had been completed were extensively rebuilt, and the remaining sixteen vessels projected were cancelled in favor of a new design which would address these design issues from the beginning. Sixteen Ōtori-class vessels were ordered in the 1934 2nd Naval Armaments Supplement Programme, of which eight were completed between 1936 and 1937. The remaining eight were cancelled in favor of building additional submarine chasers.

Design
Benefiting from the redesign of the Chidori-class, the Ōtori-class had a slightly longer hull with an increased beam. The bridge structure was also lower than on the Chidori-class to help keep the center-of-gravity low.

The armament of the Ōtori-class was almost the same as for the rebuilt Chidori-class with a main battery of three single 12 cm/45 3rd Year Type naval guns which to elevate to 55 degrees for a limited anti-aircraft capability. The torpedo mount was upgraded from a twin to a triple torpedo launcher, and a single Type 94 depth charge launcher was carried. However, anti-aircraft weaponry was only a single license-built Vickers 40 mm (2 pounder pom pom).

During the Pacific War, in 1944 survivors had the aft gun removed, and up to three twin-mount and five single-mount Type 96 25mm AA guns were installed as well as a Type 22 and a Type 13 radar. The number of depth charges was increased to 48.

Operational service
The Ōtori-class were used extensively from the start of the Pacific War to escort invasion convoys to the Philippines, Dutch East Indies and the Solomon Islands.  sank the  during the Solomon Islands campaign on 16 February 1943. Seven of the eight ships in the class were sunk by submarines or air attack in the Pacific or the South China Sea and only
 survived to the end of the war.

Ships in class

Notes

References
Collection of writings by Sizuo Fukui Vol.5, Stories of Japanese Destroyers, Kōjinsha (Japan) 1993, 
Model Art Extra No.340, Drawings of Imperial Japanese Naval Vessels Part-1, Model Art Co. Ltd. (Japan), October 1989, Book code 08734-10
The Maru Special, Japanese Naval Vessels No.39 Japanese Torpedo Boats, Ushio Shobō (Japan), May 1980, Book code 68343-40

External links
Japanese "Otori" Class Torpedo Boats
Japanese Torpedo Boats: Tabular Movement Records (TROMs)
Japanese Torpedo Boats

World War II naval ships of Japan